René Collet (28 December 1930 – 17 September 2007) was a French alpine skier. He competed in the men's downhill at the 1956 Winter Olympics.

References

External links
 

1930 births
2007 deaths
French male alpine skiers
Olympic alpine skiers of France
Alpine skiers at the 1956 Winter Olympics
Sportspeople from Savoie